Kuan Beng Hong (born 9 February 1983) is a former badminton player from Malaysia.

Achievements

Asian Championships 
Men's singles

IBF World Grand Prix 
The World Badminton Grand Prix sanctioned by International Badminton Federation (IBF) from 1983 to 2006.

Men's singles

References

External links
 Kuan Beng Hong at BWF.tournamentsoftware.com

Malaysian male badminton players
Badminton players at the 2006 Asian Games
Asian Games bronze medalists for Malaysia
Asian Games medalists in badminton
Medalists at the 2006 Asian Games
Competitors at the 2005 Southeast Asian Games
Competitors at the 2007 Southeast Asian Games
Competitors at the 2009 Southeast Asian Games
Southeast Asian Games gold medalists for Malaysia
Southeast Asian Games silver medalists for Malaysia
Southeast Asian Games bronze medalists for Malaysia
Southeast Asian Games medalists in badminton
Malaysian sportspeople of Chinese descent
1983 births
Living people
People from Kedah
21st-century Malaysian people